Enrique Ramón Fajarnés (1929 – 14 September 2020) was a Spanish lawyer and politician who served as Mayor of Ibiza, as a Senator, and as a Deputy.

References

1929 births
2020 deaths
Spanish politicians